The 1941 Coppa Italia Final was the final of the 1940–41 Coppa Italia. It was held on 8 and 15 June 1941 between Roma and Venezia. The first leg, played in Rome, ended 3–3; the second leg was played seven days later in Venice, where hometown team won 1–0.

First leg

Second leg

References 
Coppa Italia 1940/41 statistics at rsssf.com
 https://www.calcio.com/calendario/ita-coppa-italia-1940-1941-finale/2/
 https://www.worldfootball.net/schedule/ita-coppa-italia-1940-1941-finale/2/

Coppa Italia Finals
Coppa Italia Final 1941
Venezia F.C. matches